In philosophy, euthymia ("gladness, good mood, serenity", literally "good thumos") is, according to the ancient Greek philosopher Democritus, a basis of human life goals.

Diogenes Laërtius records Democritus' view as follows: "The chief good he asserts to be cheerfulness (euthymia); which, however, he does not consider the same as pleasure; as some people, who have misunderstood him, have fancied that he meant; but he understands by cheerfulness, a condition according to which the soul lives calmly and steadily, being disturbed by no fear, or superstition, or other passion."

In Seneca’s essay on tranquility, euthymia is defined as “believing in yourself and trusting that you are on the right path, and not being in doubt by following the myriad footpaths of those wandering in every direction.”

See also
 Ataraxia
 Thumos
 Euthymia (medicine)

References

Sources
 Democritus: Ethics – Stanford Encyclopedia of Philosophy

Concepts in ancient Greek ethics
Happiness